The Grammy Award for Best Classical Crossover Album was awarded from 1999 to 2011.

The award was discontinued from 2012 in a major overhaul of Grammy categories. In the present day, if a classical crossover release is a non-classical artist making a classical album it should be entered in the appropriate classical category. If the release is a classical artist making a non-classical album it should be entered in the appropriate genre category (Pop, New Age, Jazz, etc.)

Years reflect the year in which the Grammy Awards were presented, for works released in the previous year.

Recipients

References

 
Album awards
Grammy Awards for classical music